Mount Adams is a geographic landmark and residential neighborhood of Cincinnati, Ohio, located directly east of downtown Cincinnati, south of Walnut Hills, southwest of East Walnut Hills, and west of the East End.

Mount Adams is surrounded by Eden Park.  The park borders the hill on three sides.  Located within the park is the Krohn Conservatory and one of Cincinnati's oldest water works projects, now part of the park. Mt. Adams landmarks include the Cincinnati Art Museum, Playhouse in the Park, Rookwood Pottery (now converted to a restaurant), Pilgrim Presbyterian Church, Holy Cross Monastery and the Immaculata Church.

Demographics

Source - City of Cincinnati Statistical Database

History

Mount Adams was originally known as Mount Ida. The namesake was from Ida Martin, a washerwoman who lived in the hollow of an old sycamore tree located on a steep hill.

In the early 1800s the steep Mount Adams hillside was largely barren as early settlers had cut down all the trees for timber to construct their homes.

In 1831, Nicholas Longworth, a wealthy attorney, purchased the mansion that is now the Taft Museum of Art and the large lot of land behind including barren Mount Adams.  He transformed the hill into a vineyard. Longworth would become the first commercially successful winemaker in the United States, and has been called the "Father of the American Wine Industry." During the 1830s and 1840s Longworth cultivated Catawba grapes, which were used in making his champagne known as Golden Wedding. The wine inspired Henry Wadsworth Longfellow to write the poem "Ode to the Catawba Wine." Contemporaries reported that Longworth's wine "transcends the Champagne of France." The winemaking industry around Cincinnati grew rapidly for several decades until it was virtually destroyed by downy mildew, powdery mildew, and black rot around 1860. The American Civil War created a shortage of manpower needed for vineyard labor, and the death of Longworth in 1863 furthered the end of Cincinnati's wine industry.

Allegedly to increase his property value Longworth donated a portion of the hilltop to the Cincinnati Astronomical Society for an observatory. When the Cincinnati Observatory opened in 1843 it owned the most powerful telescope of its kind. The hill was renamed Mount Adams in honor of President John Quincy Adams, who delivered the observatory's dedication address. The observatory is still in operation today, though in 1871 it was moved to its current location in Mount Lookout due to excessive smoke from downtown buildings. The old observatory later became the Holy Cross Monastery and Church and expanded, but closed in 1977. The monastery is now the corporate headquarters of Towne Properties – a property management company.

Although Cincinnati was largely Presbyterian in its early history, Mount Adams was originally a strongly Catholic working-class community composed of the Germans and Irish.  The first Protestant church of any denomination to be founded in that neighborhood was Pilgrim Presbyterian Church on Ida Street, near the Ida Street Viaduct.

During the American Civil War two artillery emplacements were installed on the hill to help defend the city from the Confederacy. One was installed at Fort View Place and the other near the present location of the Playhouse in the Park. Neither gun was ever fired.

The Mount Adams Incline was completed in 1872 and linked downtown Cincinnati with the hilltop community. The Highland House, the incline hilltop resort, was a popular entertainment venue. Around that time the hill became occupied by a working-class blue-collar population. The Incline was closed in 1948.

Then in 1892 Maria Longworth, granddaughter of Nicholas Longworth, opened Rookwood Pottery. Her work is still collected today by many and highly sought after.

In the late 1960s people began to gentrify the hilltop neighborhood, including workers who wanted to live near their downtown offices.

References

External links

Mt. Adams

 
Neighborhoods in Cincinnati